Te Maunga is a suburb of Tauranga in the Bay of Plenty, in New Zealand's North Island.

A large timber fire broke out in Te Maunga in November 2019.

The area experienced surface flooding in June 2020.

In September 2020, the New Zealand Transport Agency began work on a new traffic interchange.

Demographics

Te Maunga had a population of 7,392 at the 2018 New Zealand census, an increase of 1,515 people (25.8%) since the 2013 census, and an increase of 1,776 people (31.6%) since the 2006 census. There were 3,117 households, comprising 3,375 males and 4,017 females, giving a sex ratio of 0.84 males per female, with 1,137 people (15.4%) aged under 15 years, 1,032 (14.0%) aged 15 to 29, 2,838 (38.4%) aged 30 to 64, and 2,385 (32.3%) aged 65 or older.

Ethnicities were 84.7% European/Pākehā, 17.3% Māori, 3.0% Pacific peoples, 4.7% Asian, and 2.3% other ethnicities. People may identify with more than one ethnicity.

The percentage of people born overseas was 19.8, compared with 27.1% nationally.

Although some people chose not to answer the census's question about religious affiliation, 47.3% had no religion, 40.7% were Christian, 2.6% had Māori religious beliefs, 0.3% were Hindu, 0.1% were Muslim, 0.4% were Buddhist and 2.1% had other religions.

Of those at least 15 years old, 1,104 (17.6%) people had a bachelor's or higher degree, and 1,332 (21.3%) people had no formal qualifications. 861 people (13.8%) earned over $70,000 compared to 17.2% nationally. The employment status of those at least 15 was that 2,520 (40.3%) people were employed full-time, 753 (12.0%) were part-time, and 180 (2.9%) were unemployed.

References

Suburbs of Tauranga